Mount Electra is a prominent peak, over  high, immediately west of Mount Dido in the Olympus Range of Victoria Land. It was named by the Victoria University of Wellington Antarctic Expedition (1958–59) for Electra, a figure in Greek mythology.

References 

Mountains of Victoria Land
Scott Coast